NFL QB Club 2001, also known as NFL Quarterback Club 2001, is an American football game for the Nintendo 64 and Dreamcast. Part of the NFL Quarterback Club series, it is the last title in the series to be released for the N64 and DC. The game follows in the footsteps of the previous three titles on both consoles, with a full on NFL football simulation with all the teams, players and stats. The game cartridge was red, unlike the usual gray color for N64 cartridges.

Game Modes 
Modes include Exhibition, Season, Practice & Pro Bowl, with the option for players to play past NFL Super Bowl games or create their own custom simulation.

Custom Options 
The player can also create their own team and players, a full play book, and sign or trade players pre-season.

Reception 

The Nintendo 64 version received "mixed" reviews, while the Dreamcast version received "generally unfavorable reviews", according to the review aggregation website Metacritic.

References

External links 

2000 video games
Dreamcast games
High Voltage Software games
NFL Quarterback Club
Nintendo 64 games
North America-exclusive video games
Acclaim Entertainment games
Video games developed in the United States